Luiz Eduardo Fleuri Pacheco (born 1 February 1997), commonly known as Dudu Pacheco, is a Brazilian professional footballer who plays as a defensive midfielder or a right back for J.League club Júbilo Iwata.

Career statistics

Club

Notes

References

1997 births
Living people
Brazilian footballers
Brazilian expatriate footballers
Association football defenders
Campeonato Brasileiro Série B players
Campeonato Brasileiro Série C players
Vila Nova Futebol Clube players
Grêmio Foot-Ball Porto Alegrense players
Clube do Remo players
Clube Atlético Votuporanguense players
Jaraguá Esporte Clube players
Júbilo Iwata players
Universiade medalists in football
Universiade silver medalists for Brazil
Medalists at the 2019 Summer Universiade
Sportspeople from Amazonas (Brazilian state)
Brazilian expatriate sportspeople in Japan
Expatriate footballers in Japan